Qâa er Rîm   (also known as Qā‘ar Rīm) is a populated place in the Beqaa Governorate of Lebanon.

References

External links
 Qaa Er Rim, Localiban

  

Populated places in Zahlé District